Tommy Jaud (born 16 July 1970, in Schweinfurt) is a German author, scriptwriter, and freelance author for many television productions.

Life
After completing his Abitur, Jaud served his compulsory civil service in a kindergarten. He went on to study German Studies at the University of Bamberg. During his time as a student, Jaud presented a radio show for Antenne Thüringen and worked on a freelance basis for the Harald Schmidt Show, a German television programme. He later abandoned his studies and headed for Cologne where he worked on various television productions. He was creative producer of the comedy series Ladykracher and head writer for Sat.1's Die Wochenshow. He also wrote for the Liebesleben series.

Jaud's published works, in German Vollidiot, Resturlaub and Millionär, have been recorded as audio books by Christoph Maria Herbst, and Vollidiot has been made into a film with comedian Oliver Pocher playing the main role of Simon Peters. He already had experience of working with Engelke and Baumann after they teamed up to write Ladykracher a few years previously.

The author describes his works as "readable television". He came up with this idea as, prior to being an author, he had worked on television scripts.

The German magazine Der Spiegel has championed Jaud's books as the rebirth of a stagnant genre, namely that of the German men's novel.

References

External links
 His official website 

1970 births
Living people
21st-century German novelists
German television writers
Male television writers
People from Schweinfurt
German male screenwriters
German male novelists
21st-century German male writers
21st-century German screenwriters